The Bank of California Building is a 1908 Greco-Roman style structure with a brutalist, 22-story tower annexed in 1967 at 400 California Street in the financial district of San Francisco, California.

Union Bank acquired the building in 1996 as part of its merger with Bank of California.

See also
 List of San Francisco Designated Landmarks
 San Francisco's tallest buildings

References

External links

Office buildings completed in 1908
Office buildings completed in 1967
Landmarks in San Francisco
Skyscraper office buildings in San Francisco
Bliss and Faville buildings
Anshen and Allen buildings
Financial District, San Francisco
1908 establishments in California